Virtue is a 1932 American Pre-Code romance film directed by Edward Buzzell and starring Carole Lombard and Pat O'Brien.

Plot
New York City streetwalker Mae (Carole Lombard) is told by police to leave New York. However, she gets off the train at a suburban station, taking the cab of Jimmy Doyle (Pat O'Brien). He says he knows women well and does not think much of them. She slips away without paying the fare, as she is penniless. Fellow prostitute Lil (Mayo Methot) advises her to find honest work.

Receiving a loan, Mae goes to pay Jimmy the fare. They argue, but are mutually attracted and he finds her a job. By coincidence, Gert (Shirley Grey), another ex prostitute, also works there. Jimmy and Mae marry, but Mae has not told him about her past. When a policeman appears to arrest Mae for breaking bail conditions, Jimmy leaves to think things over. He then says he will try to make the marriage work, on condition that Mae has given up prostitution and avoids her old friends.

Jimmy has saved money to become a partner in a gas station. When Gert asks for money for a doctor, Mae takes it from Jimmy's savings. She learns Gert has lied and, when Jimmy tells her he will need the money, Mae finds Gert who promises to get her it. However, Gert has given the money to her boyfriend Toots (Jack La Rue), who is also Lil's pimp. When Gert tries to steal it back from him, Toots catches her and accidentally kills her. He hides the body, then watches from hiding as Mae shows up; she finds the money and leaves.

The police arrest Mae because she left her bag in Gert's apartment. However, a mistrustful Jimmy had been following Mae and knows a man was with Gert. He learns that it was Toots, but Lil gives Toots an alibi. Lil convinces Toots to go to the DA’s office and lodge a complaint against Jimmy, but when they’re there she rats Toots out for the murder of Gert. Toots is taken into custody and Mae is exonerated.

Cast
 Carole Lombard as Mae
 Pat O'Brien as Jimmy 
 Ward Bond as Frank
 Shirley Grey as Gert
 Mayo Methot as Lil 
 Jack La Rue as Toots 
 Willard Robertson as MacKenzie
 Lew Kelly as Magistrate 
 Fred Santley as Hank 
 Arthur Wanzer as Flanagan
 Jessie Arnold as Landlady
 Edwin Stanley as District Attorney

External links
 
 
 
 

1932 films
1932 romantic drama films
American black-and-white films
American romantic drama films
Columbia Pictures films
1930s English-language films
Films about prostitution in the United States
Films directed by Edward Buzzell
Films set in New York City
1930s American films